The Grand Pabos River or Pabos North River is a river in the Gaspé Peninsula of Quebec, Canada, which has its source at Lake of the North (Lac du Nord in French), fed by streams of the Chic-Choc Mountains. Its name comes from the Mi'kmaq word pabog meaning "tranquility waters".

Salmon fishing

The Grand Pabos River is known for its Atlantic Salmon (salmo salar) fishing in clear water and deep forest with no human presence. The river has long been a renowned salmon river from 1880 to 1950. Overfished, the salmons were almost completely annihilated in 1984 and the river was closed to fisherman. It has been reopened since 2003.

Access and administration

The river is accessible via Quebec Route 132 and is managed by an organisation that administrates salmon fishing on the 3 Pabos Rivers.  It is easy to fish the Grand Pabos West River and the Petit Pabos River on the same fishing trip.

See also
List of rivers of Quebec
Grand Pabos West River
Petit Pabos River

References

Rivers of Gaspésie–Îles-de-la-Madeleine
Gaspé Peninsula